A53T Mutation is a point mutation of the Alpha-synuclein protein, a 140-amino acid protein found in pre-synaptic terminals of neurons in the brain.

Protein
Alpha-synuclein has more than one known point-mutation, one being A53T where amino acid residue 53 is mutated from its native alanine to a threonine.  Wild-type alpha-synuclein fibrils are known to be the primary component of Lewy bodies, which are found in the brain of Parkinson's disease patients. The A53T mutation has been shown have faster kinetics of fibrilization than the wild-type protein. A53T alpha-synuclein has also been linked to early on-set familial Parkinson's disease. Advancements in technology have allowed the development of transgenic mice expressing A53T alpha-synuclein that have been used in multiple studies on Parkinson's disease. Wild-type alpha-synuclein has been shown to form oligomeric species termed protofibrils before forming full fibrils. Research has been conducted to test the hypothesis that the oligomeric protofibril species is neurotoxic rather than the fibrillar species. Electron microscopy has revealed that the A53T mutant protein formed annular and tubular protofibrils easily, whereas the wild-type protein formed annular protofibrils only after extended incubation. This early on-set mutation has been shown to increase the protofibril population that, if toxic, would increase the amount of the toxic species in the brain. There is clinical significance in studying the effects of A53T alpha-synuclein on the protofibrillar species as it may be a relevant therapeutic target in treating early on-set Parkinson's disease.

References 

Peripheral membrane proteins